Csc-1, CSC-1, csc-1, or csc−1 may refer to:

 csc x−1 = csc(x)−1 = excsc(x) or excosecant of x, an old trigonometric function
 csc−1y = csc−1(y), sometimes interpreted as arccsc(y) or arccosecant of y, the compositional inverse of the trigonometric function cosecant (see below for ambiguity)
 csc−1x = csc−1(x), sometimes interpreted as (csc(x))−1 =  = sin(x) or sine of x, the multiplicative inverse (or reciprocal) of the trigonometric function cosecant (see above for ambiguity)
 csc x−1, sometimes interpreted as csc(x−1) = csc(), the cosecant of the multiplicative inverse (or reciprocal) of x (see below for ambiguity)
 csc x−1, sometimes interpreted as (csc(x))−1 =  = sin(x) or sine of x, the multiplicative inverse (or reciprocal) of the trigonometric function cosecant (see above for ambiguity)

See also
Inverse function
sin−1 (disambiguation)
sec−1 (disambiguation)